The Godwin-Austen Glacier is a glacier in the Karakoram range and is close to K2, the highest mountain peak in Pakistan and second highest on Earth, in Gilgit–Baltistan, Pakistan. Its confluence with the Baltoro Glacier is called Concordia and is a popular trekking destination as it provides views of four of the five eight-thousanders in the region.

The glacier can be approached via the Balti town of Skardu. It receives its name from Henry Haversham Godwin-Austen, an early explorer of this region. K2 was originally named Mount Godwin-Austin in his honour.

List of peaks
Peaks near Concordia include:

 K2, 2nd highest of the world at 8,611m.
 Gasherbrum I, 11th highest of the world at 8,080m.
 Broad Peak, 12th highest of the world at 8,047m.
 Gasherbrum II, 13th highest of the world at 8,035m.
 Gasherbrum III, 7,946m. (Often regarded as a subpeak of Gasherbrum II.)
 Gasherbrum IV, 17th highest of the world at 7,932m.
 Masherbrum (K1), 22nd highest of the world at 7,821m.
 Chogolisa, 36th highest of the world at 7,665m.
 Muztagh Tower, 7,273m.
 Snow Dome, 7,160m.
 Biarchedi, 6,781 m
 Mitre Peak, 6,010m.

See also
 Baltoro Glacier
 Gilgit–Baltistan
 Eight-thousander
 List of mountains in Pakistan
 List of highest mountains
 List of glaciers

External links
 Photos from Concordia by Kelly Cheng

Glaciers of the Karakoram
Glaciers of Gilgit-Baltistan